The Pont de Neuilly (English: Bridge of Neuilly) is a road and rail bridge carrying the Route nationale 13 (N13) and Paris Métro Line 1 which crosses the Seine between the right bank of Neuilly-sur-Seine and Courbevoie and Puteaux on the left bank in the department of Hauts-de-Seine. It faces the headquarters of La Défense and is aligned on the Axe historique of Paris.

History

The first bridge on the site was in wood, built after the fall of Henry IV and Marie de Médicis's carriage in June 1606. The second was a 219m-long five-arched structure built in 1774 by Jean-Rodolphe Perronet, founder of the École des ponts et chaussées (a stone statue of him is now at the foot of the bridge, at the west point of the Île de Puteaux). The second bridge was demolished between 1936 and 1942 and replaced in 1942 with a metal bridge by Louis-Alexandre Lévy and the Daydé company. In 1992, its pedestrian sidewalks were narrowed to allow Line 1 to be added to the bridge and the bridge gave its name to the nearby Métro station.

The present bridge effectively consisted of two bridges: a 67 metre span between Neuilly-sur-Seine and the Île de Puteaux, as well as an 87 metre span between the Île de Puteaux and Courbevoie. A pedestrian staircase in the middle of the bridge allows access to the Île de Puteaux.

References

Neuilly
Buildings and structures demolished in 1942

Transport in Hauts-de-Seine